Anastasia Valueva (born 29 November 1993) is a Russian taekwondo practitioner.

Valueva won the silver medal in the women's finweight (−46 kg) class at the 2013 World Taekwondo Championships, losing to Kim So-hui of South Korea 7–6 in the final match. 
She also won the gold medal in the girls' −44 kg division at the inaugural 2010 Youth Olympic Games in Singapore.

References

External links
 

1993 births
Living people
Russian female taekwondo practitioners
Taekwondo practitioners at the 2010 Summer Youth Olympics
Universiade medalists in taekwondo
Universiade gold medalists for Russia
Youth Olympic gold medalists for Russia
World Taekwondo Championships medalists
Medalists at the 2011 Summer Universiade
21st-century Russian women